The Locke School is a historic school building at 88 Park Avenue in Arlington, Massachusetts. The two-story brick building was built in 1899 to a design by Gay & Proctor. Shaped like an H, it has a hip roof and Renaissance Revival styling. It was built in the site of an older wood-frame school (built 1878), which was moved and used by the railroad until it was demolished about 1936. In 1984 this building was converted into condominiums.

The building was listed on the National Register of Historic Places in 1985.

See also
National Register of Historic Places listings in Arlington, Massachusetts

References

School buildings on the National Register of Historic Places in Massachusetts
Buildings and structures in Arlington, Massachusetts
National Register of Historic Places in Arlington, Massachusetts